Lake Raku is an artificial lake in Tallinn, Estonia, located between Männiku road and Viljandi highway.

It is 3130 meters long, and 1070 meters wide. The average depth is 7,2 meters, and sonar surveys show that the north east part is up to 18,2 meters deep.

See also
List of lakes of Estonia

Lakes of Estonia
Landforms of Tallinn